Charles Sykes may refer to:
Sir Charles Sykes, 1st Baronet (1868–1950), British wool merchant and politician
Charles Robinson Sykes (1875–1950), British sculptor
Charles H. Sykes (1881–1966), American member of the Wisconsin State Assembly
Charles Henry Sykes (1882–1942), American cartoonist
Sir Charles Sykes (metallurgist) (1905–1982), British metallurgist, President of the Physical Society
Charlie Sykes (born 1954), American talk radio host and political commentator